Arad A. McCutchan (July 4, 1912 – June 16, 1993) was a collegiate basketball coach. The Evansville, Indiana, native coached his hometown University of Evansville from 1946 to 1977, guiding the Purple Aces to a 514–314 record.

McCutchan spent seven years coaching Benjamin Bosse High School (1936–1943) before serving in the United States Navy during World War II. In 1946 he took over the head coaching position at University of Evansville. In the following years he guided them to five NCAA College Division Basketball Championships (1959, 1960, 1964, 1965, 1971) as well as three undefeated seasons in their conference (1964, 1965, 1971). McCutchan was named NCAA College Division Coach of the Year two times (1964, 1965). He was an assistant coach to Gene Bartow for the US national team in the 1974 FIBA World Championship, where he won the bronze medal. On April 27, 1981, he was elected to the Naismith Memorial Basketball Hall of Fame.  He was inducted in the Indiana Basketball Hall of Fame in 1973. After retiring from coaching he and his wife Virginia moved to Santa Claus, Indiana.

His first name, Arad, was inherited from a grandfather who was named from the Bible.  He often said the name was Hebrew for "wild ass."

References

External links
 

1912 births
1993 deaths
American men's basketball coaches
Basketball coaches from Indiana
College men's basketball head coaches in the United States
Evansville Purple Aces men's basketball coaches
High school basketball coaches in Indiana
Naismith Memorial Basketball Hall of Fame inductees
National Collegiate Basketball Hall of Fame inductees
People from Santa Claus, Indiana
Sportspeople from Evansville, Indiana